Justice Wagner may refer to:

David Wagner (judge) (1826–1902), associate justice of the Supreme Court of Missouri
Henry F. Wagner (died 1943), associate justice of the Supreme Court of Iowa